On November 19, 2015, an assailant approached the entrance of a Tel Aviv synagogue at prayer time, and stabbed and killed two worshipers.  The attacker was arrested.

Attack
The attacker approached the entrance to the informal prayer room located in a South Tel Aviv building during afternoon prayers.  Worshippers inside the synagogue became aware of the attack when a man covered in blood staggered into the room and someone shouted, "There's a terrorist."  Some worshipers assisted the wounded man while the other men who had been praying rushed to close the door, leaning against it to prevent the attacker from entering. When the terrorist ceased attempting to shove the door open, they rushed out with makeshift weapons to try to subdue him.

Context
This attack shocked the nation coming, as it did, after a period of calm, free of terror attacks. According to the Jewish non-governmental organization ADL, it was "the bloodiest day in Israel since this latest round of Palestinian violence began back in September."

This was the first attack to be carried out by a Palestinian who had successfully passed through the security screening process and obtained a permit to work in Israel.

Impact
The Coordinator of Government Activities in the Territories responded by suspending 1,200 entry permits to Israel, for Palestinians from the Hebron area.

Victims
Aharon Yesiab (Yesayev) (32), dead at the scene
Reuven Aviram (51), who died within hours, in hospital.

Assailant
The attacker, Raid Halil bin Mahmoud (36), father of five, was arrested and identified as an Arab from the town of Dura.   He had recently been granted a permit to work in a Tel Aviv restaurant, but told authorities that his purpose in getting the permit had been to kill Jews.  The attacker had been granted the work permit enabling him to enter Israel only 4 days before he stabbed two men to death at the synagogue.  The assailant was indicted for murder on 13 December 2015.

Responses
 Hamas stated, "We welcome the heroic operation in Tel Aviv that killed two people... We call on the Palestinians to continue such activities."
 The attacker's mother stated: "My son is a source of pride for Hebron and Palestine."

The Israeli government demolished Raid Halil bin Mahmoud's West Bank home in response to the attack.

See also
 2015 Gush Etzion Junction shooting
 List of violent incidents in the Israeli–Palestinian conflict, July–December 2015

References

2015 in Judaism
Mass stabbings in Israel
Stabbing attacks in 2015
21st-century attacks on synagogues and Jewish communal organizations
Terrorist incidents in Israel in 2015
Terrorist incidents in Tel Aviv
Terrorist incidents involving knife attacks
November 2015 events in Asia
Knife attacks
Attacks on buildings and structures in Israel
2010s crimes in Tel Aviv